Lionsgate Premiere is the speciality film division of entertainment company Lionsgate Films that specializes in direct-to-video and direct-to-video on demand.

Background
On April 1, 2015, Lionsgate confirmed they had launched
speciality division to release films theatrically, through video on demand, and streaming services and streaming platforms. Marketing for the new label would be headed by Lionsgate senior VP of marketing and research, Jean McDowell. Lionsgate marketing officer, Tim Palen, would help with the promotional efforts.

Adam Sorensen, manager of sales, would take charge of Lionsgate Premiere’s distribution. That same month, it was announced several of Grindstone Entertainment Group's films would be released under the label. The division also released select films by CBS Films as part of the distribution partnership with parent company Lionsgate, with the only release being Get a Job. Premiere and Hulu teamed to release Joshy.

Films

References

 
Entertainment companies based in California
Companies based in Los Angeles County, California
Entertainment companies established in 2015
2015 establishments in California